Rosedale is a census-designated place in Grant County, New Mexico, United States. Its population was 394 as of the 2010 census. Rosedale was established in 1882 by prospector Jack Richardson and his wife Rose.

Geography

Demographics

References

Census-designated places in New Mexico
Census-designated places in Grant County, New Mexico